Madison Academy is a private, co-educational school located in Huntsville, Alabama, United States. The school is near Madison, Alabama, but is actually in the city of Huntsville.  It got its name from Madison County and was originally located near Max Luther Rd. at Meridian Street in Huntsville. It serves students in preschool through 12th grade. (Preschool - 1st are in "Little MA", while 2nd - 12th attend school in the main MA building.) The school is affiliated with and endorsed by many area churches of Christ. It competes at the 4A level of athletics in the Alabama High School Athletic Association under the nickname "Mustangs".

Madison Academy has a current enrollment of 846 students.

Notable alumni
 Don Black (b. 1953), Grand Wizard of the Ku Klux Klan and founder of the Stormfront website
 Jordan Matthews, wide receiver, NFL player
 Kerron Johnson, basketball player for the New Zealand SkyCity Breakers.
 Kerryon Johnson, running back, NFL player

References

External links
 Madison Academy site
 Madison Academy Baseball site

Christian schools in Alabama
Educational institutions established in 1955
Private elementary schools in Alabama
Private high schools in Alabama
Protestant schools
Schools in Madison County, Alabama
Private middle schools in Alabama
1955 establishments in Alabama